Oday Aboushi (born June 5, 1991) is a Palestinian-American American football offensive guard who is a free agent. He played college football at Virginia and was selected by the New York Jets in the fifth round of the 2013 NFL Draft. He has also played for the Houston Texans, Seattle Seahawks, Oakland Raiders, Arizona Cardinals, Detroit Lions and Los Angeles Chargers.

Early years
Aboushi was born in Brooklyn, New York.  He attended Xaverian High School in Brooklyn, where he was a member of the Xaverian high school football team.

College career
Aboushi attended the University of Virginia, where he played for the Virginia Cavaliers football team from 2009 to 2012.  During his college career, he started 37 of 43 games in which he appeared.  As a senior in 2012, he was a first-team All-Atlantic Coast Conference (ACC) selection.

Professional career

New York Jets
The New York Jets selected Aboushi in the fifth round, with the 141st overall pick, of the 2013 NFL Draft. The Jets signed him to a four-year rookie contract on May 10, 2013; financial terms were not disclosed. 

Aboushi was inactive in 2013 for all 16 regular season games with the Jets. In 2014, he started 10 games after the starter was injured. 

Aboushi was suspended without pay (about $34,400) for the first game of the 2015 season for violating the NFL Policy and Program for Substances of Abuse, in August 2015. Aboushi was released by the Jets on September 15, 2015, one day after his suspension for violating the NFL's substance abuse policy ended.

Houston Texans
The Houston Texans claimed Aboushi off of waivers on September 16, 2015.

Seattle Seahawks
On March 17, 2017, Aboushi signed with the Seattle Seahawks. He started eight games at right guard before suffering a dislocated shoulder injury in Week 15. He was placed on injured reserve on December 13, 2017.

Oakland Raiders
On July 28, 2018, Aboushi signed with the Oakland Raiders reuniting him with his previous year offensive line coach Tom Cable. He was released on September 1, 2018.

Arizona Cardinals
On October 23, 2018, Aboushi signed with the Arizona Cardinals.

Detroit Lions
On March 14, 2019, Aboushi signed a one-year, $2 million contract with the Detroit Lions. On March 27, 2020, he re-signed with the Lions. He was released during final roster cuts on September 5, 2020, but re-signed with the team the next day. He was fined $5,221 by the NFL for unnecessary roughness in Week 2.

Los Angeles Chargers
On March 20, 2021, Aboushi signed with the Los Angeles Chargers. He was named the Chargers starting right guard for the 2021 season. However, he suffered a torn ACL in Week 5 and was placed on season-ending injured reserve on October 12, 2021.

Los Angeles Rams
On September 14, 2022, Aboushi signed with the practice squad of the Los Angeles Rams. He was promoted to the active roster six days later. He was suspended for one game on December 26, 2022. His suspension was overturned a day later.

Personal life
Aboushi is the ninth of ten children born to Palestinian parents who immigrated to New York from Beit Hanina, a Palestinian neighborhood in East Jerusalem. He is the brother of civil rights lawyer and Democratic candidate for Manhattan District Attorney Tahanie Aboushi. He speaks English and Arabic.

He is a practicing Muslim, one of few in the NFL. During Ramadan, which fell during training camp season at Virginia, he fasted from dawn to sunset most days. He was one of about a dozen Muslim athletes honored by the U.S. Department of State for contributions in 2011. He is one of the first Palestinian players in the NFL.

On July 12, 2013, the Jewish NGO the Anti-Defamation League issued a press release defending Aboushi after an article circulating online claimed he was a 'Muslim extremist'. The ADL defended Aboushi's right to take 'pride in his Palestinian heritage' and emphatically stated that being pro-Palestinian is in no way equivalent to being anti-Semitic or a Muslim extremist.

See also
List of suspensions in the National Football League

References

External links
Detroit Lions bio
Virginia Cavaliers bio

Living people
1991 births
American football offensive tackles
American football offensive guards
American people of Palestinian descent
American Muslims
Sportspeople from Brooklyn
Players of American football from New York City
Xaverian High School alumni
Virginia Cavaliers football players
New York Jets players
Houston Texans players
Seattle Seahawks players
Oakland Raiders players
Arizona Cardinals players
Detroit Lions players
Los Angeles Chargers players
Los Angeles Rams players